Albro Lyons Sr. was a New Yorker of mixed heritage who advocated for educational opportunities and worked to free slaves. There is a double ambrotype of he and his wife. His daughter Maritcha Remond Lyons wrote a memoir about the family.

His boarding house for seamen was an important stop on the underground railroad. He was a member of the New York African Society for Mutual Relief.

His son Albro Lyons Jr. lived from 1854 until 1906.

References

Underground Railroad people
19th-century American people
Year of birth missing
Year of death missing